Terricula major is a moth of the family Tortricidae. It is found in Vietnam.

The wingspan is 18 mm. The ground colour of the forewings is brownish with brown suffusions and a few white dashes along the costa. There are sparse refractive bluish scales all over the surface of the wing. The markings are dark brown. The hindwings are brown.

Etymology
The name refers to size of the moth and the terminal process of the aedeagus and is derived from Latin major (meaning larger).

References

Moths described in 2008
Archipini